Schistura maepaiensis is a species of ray-finned fish, a stone loach in the genus Schistura. Its habitat is riffles in streams with a gravel or stone bed and a moderate to fast current. It is occasionally found in the aquarium trade and its populations may be affected by any human activities which interrupt fast flowing water, such as logging or agriculture.

References

M
Fish described in 1990